Garra gravelyi, the Burmese garra, is a species of ray-finned fish in the genus Garra.

References 

Garra
Taxa named by Nelson Annandale
Fish described in 1919